The Szpilman Award is an annual art prize. It is awarded to works that exist only for a moment or a short period of time. The purpose of the award is to promote such works whose forms consist of ephemeral situations. It was first presented in 2003 and is still the only award for ephemeral works worldwide. The prize is open for the public.

Background

The Szpilman Award is initiated, financed and organized by German-based art group Szpilman. It was founded in 2003. Initially only people from Germany could apply. Regulations were changed in 2004 and opened the call for Europe. The public interest in the prize raised. In 2006 Szpilman abolished any restrictions: everyone from all over the world can apply now for the Szpilman Award. The winner is chosen by a panel of up to 10 independent judges including the winner of the previous year. The prize is accompanied with a dynamic cash award (sum of money collected by members of the jury parallel to the competition, called "Jackpot Stipendium"), a trip to Cimochowizna (Poland), and a challenge cup whichwill be handed over to the next prize winner in the subsequent year.

Since 2008 the Szpilman Award is also running a daily bulletin about ephemeral works, called "Potz!Blitz!Szpilman!".

To make ephemeral works more public and to show a greater variety of possibilities members of Szpilman Award curate exhibitions since 2006 in cities all around the world, called Szpilman Award Shows, e.g. in galleries, museums and public spaces in Austria, Germany, Greenland, Israel, Italy, Switzerland, The Netherlands and Turkey.

Winners and shortlisted artists

Jury

Bernd Euler (Germany)
Lise Harlev (Denmark)
 Anna Henckel-Donnersmarck (Germany)
Leonard Kahlcke (United Kingdom)
Patrick Koch (Germany)
Tina Kohlmann (Greenland)
Claus Richter (Germany)
Tina Schott (Belgium)
Michał Sznajder (Poland)
prize winner of the previous year

See also
List of European art awards

Notes and references

Notes:

References:

External links
 SZPILMAN AWARD, the official web site
 Potz!Blitz!Szpilman!'

Visual arts awards